Wyoming Highway 255 (WYO 255) is a short  unsigned Wyoming state road in the City of Casper known as N. Center Street. This route provides a connection between US 20 Business/US 26 Business and I-25/US 20/US 26/US 87 and runs concurrent with the I-25/US 87 Business route.

Route description
Wyoming Highway 255 begins its southern end at US 20 Business/US 26 Business (E 1st St./W 1st St.) in Casper and I-25 Business/US 87 Business which will join 255 from the east. This route is signed as I-25 Business and US 87 Business its whole length from its southern to northern terminus. WYO 255 is also not signed from the interstate.
However, I-25 BUS and US 87 BUS continue after Wyoming Highway 255 ends at its southern terminus by joining US 20 BUS/US 26 BUS eastbound.

Major intersections

References

Official 2003 State Highway Map of Wyoming

External links 

Wyoming State Routes 200-299

Casper, Wyoming
Transportation in Natrona County, Wyoming
255
Interstate 25
U.S. Route 87
State highways in the United States shorter than one mile